Pleasant Grove Township is one of twelve townships in Floyd County, Iowa, USA.  As of the 2000 census, its population was 213.

Geography
According to the United States Census Bureau, Pleasant Grove Township covers an area of 35.87 square miles (92.89 square kilometers).

Unincorporated towns
 Powersville at 
(This list is based on USGS data and may include former settlements.)

Adjacent townships
 Saint Charles Township (northeast)
 Riverton Township (east)
 Fremont Township, Butler County (southeast)
 Dayton Township, Butler County (south)
 Coldwater Township, Butler County (southwest)
 Union Township (west)

Cemeteries
The township contains Pleasant Grove Cemetery.

School districts
 Charles City Community School District
 Greene Community School District

Political districts
 Iowa's 4th congressional district
 State House District 14
 State Senate District 7

References
 United States Census Bureau 2008 TIGER/Line Shapefiles
 United States Board on Geographic Names (GNIS)
 United States National Atlas

External links
 US-Counties.com
 City-Data.com

Townships in Floyd County, Iowa
Townships in Iowa